Solo is a 1999 album by Hugh Cornwell, a live "plugged and unplugged" solo gig recorded at The Bergen Blues & Roots Festival in Bergen, Norway, on April 29, 1999. The album has songs from Cornwell's solo work as well as titles which he wrote and performed whilst in The Stranglers. The album was released on Cornwell's label HIS Records (HIS CD 003).

Recorded by Ole-Petter Dronen. This gig was also filmed, and some footage can be found on the album "In the dock" as an enhanced video.

Track listing
"Long Dead Train" 
"Nerves of Steel" 
"Snapper" 
"Torture Garden" 
"Hanging Around" 
"Tramp" 
"Gingerbread Girl"
"The Big Sleep" 
"Dead Loss Angeles" 
"Mothra" 
"Midnight Summer Dream" 
"Never Say Goodbye" 
"House of Sorrow" 
"Goodbye Toulouse"

References

Hugh Cornwell albums
1999 live albums